The Uglyz is a Nepali pop rock band, formed in 1995 at Little Angels' School, Lalitpur, Nepal.

History
In 1995, Sarun Tamrakar (vocalist) and Sudip Tamrakar (guitarist), both students of Little Angel's School, came together to form a school band called "The Uglyz". The band was complete when Rakin Lal Shrestha (the drummer) joined them.

The band separated when they started to pursue college abroad. Sarun went to Australia, Sudip continued studying in Nepal and Rakin left to India. After their studies, they returned to Nepal, and the band reformed in 2003. With the support of their families and friends, they decided to release their maiden album. On January 31, 2005, they released their first album "Rush", which touched many Nepalese teenagers and adults. They released their second album In Transit (2011).

The first hit song Audai Jadai was a theme translation from Japanese.

Band members
 Sarun Tamrakar
 Sudip Tamrakar
 Rakin Lal Shrestha
Sachen Bajracharya
Nirajan Rai

Albums
 Rush (2005)

 In Transit (2011)

References

External links
Lamatar / Lalitpur Photos, October 2007
Last.fm
Sanjaal.com

 Nepalese musical groups
 Nepalese rock music groups
1995 establishments in Nepal
Musical groups from Lalitpur